Thomas Frederick Buckton  (1858 - 1933) was an Anglican Archdeacon in the Mediterranean from 1922 until his death.

Buckton was educated at Hull and East Riding College and Clare College, Cambridge and ordained in 1885. After a curacy in High Harrogate he was Vicar of Horsforth then the Chaplain at Nice, France. He was Archdeacon in the Peninsula and North Africa from 1922 to 1929; and then of Gibraltar until his death on 26 December 1933.

References

Archdeacons in the Diocese in Europe

1858 births
Alumni of Clare College, Cambridge
1933 deaths
People educated at Hull and East Riding College
Archdeacons in the Diocese in Europe
Archdeacons of Gibraltar